There's No Tomorrow (French: Sans lendemain) is a 1939 French drama film directed by Max Ophüls and starring Edwige Feuillère, George Rigaud and Daniel Lecourtois. A number of those employed on the film were exiles from Nazi Germany. It premiered in Algiers in December 1939 before going on general release across France in March 1940.

The film's sets were designed by the art directors Max Douy and Eugène Lourié.

Synopsis
In order to support her young son, a woman becomes a dancer in a striptease cabaret act.

Cast
 Edwige Feuillère as Evelyn (Babs) Morin 
 George Rigaud as Dr. Georges Brandon 
 Daniel Lecourtois as Dr. Armand Péreux 
 Mady Berry as Mme. Midu, concierge 
 Michel François as Pierre, Evelyn's son 
 Georges Lannes as Paul Mazuraud 
 André Gabriello as Mario 
 Pauline Carton as La bonne Ernestine 
 Paul Azaïs as Henri 
 Jacques Erwin as Hermann 
 Louis Florencie as Drunk client
 Geo Forster a sUn danseur 
 Jane Marken as Mme Béchu 
 Léon Roger-Maxime as Le second de Mazuraud 
 René Worms as Un habitué

References

Bibliography 
 Williams, Alan L. Republic of Images: A History of French Filmmaking. Harvard University Press, 1992.

External links 
 

1939 films
1930s French-language films
Films directed by Max Ophüls
1939 drama films
French drama films
Cine-Allianz films
French black-and-white films
1930s French films